Tuqiao station may refer to:

 Tuqiao station (Changsha Metro), a metro station in Changsha, China (土桥站).
 Tuqiao station (Beijing Subway), a metro station in Beijing, China (土桥站).